Georgian football clubs have competed in European football tournaments since 1972–73 season, when Dinamo Tbilisi took part in UEFA Cup. At the time Georgian clubs were representing Soviet Union. After gaining independence in 1991, clubs took part in the UEFA Champions League (formerly European Cup), UEFA Europa League (formerly UEFA Cup), UEFA Cup Winners' Cup and UEFA Intertoto Cup. Georgian clubs have been qualifying to European competitions through the Erovnuli Liga and Georgian Cup.

The biggest achievement of Georgian club football, was winning UEFA Cup Winners' Cup in 1981 by Dinamo Tbilisi.

UEFA Rankings

Current rankings (2021–22)
UEFA Country Ranking for league participation in 2022–23 European football season.
 45  Meistriliiga
 46  Maltese Premier League
 47  Erovnuli Liga
 48  Macedonian First Football League
 49  Liechtenstein

History of rankings
Below is a historical list of Georgian rankings and country coefficient for last thirteen seasons.

European champions

Records
 Biggest home win:
  Dinamo Batumi 6–0  HB (1996)
  Torpedo Kutaisi 6–0  Erebuni-Homenmen (1998)
  Zestafoni 6–0  Lisburn Distillery (2009)
 Biggest away win:  Lantana 0–5  Torpedo Kutaisi (1999)
 Biggest home loss:  Locomotive Tbilisi 0–7 PAOK (1999)
 Biggest away loss:  Red Star Belgrade 7–0  Kolkheti-1913 Poti (1998)

All-time record by clubs
As of 29 July 2022

UEFA Champions League/European Cup
As of 15 July 2022

UEFA Europa League/UEFA Cup
As of 15 July 2022

UEFA Europa Conference League
As of 29 July 2022

UEFA Cup Winners' Cup

UEFA Intertoto Cup

Georgian clubs versus country
As of 29 July 2022

References

European football clubs in international competitions
Europe